Port Valdez is a fjord of Prince William Sound in Alaska, United States. Its main settlement is Valdez, located near the head of the bay. It marks the southern terminus of the Trans-Alaska Pipeline System. The bay is oriented east-west and its western end is connected to the larger Valdez Arm via the Valdez Narrows. It received its name from being in proximity to the town of Valdez.

References

Bays of Alaska